The Cowlitz Black Bears is an amateur baseball team located in Longview, Washington.  They play in the West Coast League, a collegiate summer baseball league.  The league comprises teams from Canada, Oregon, and Washington.  Cowlitz calls David Story Field on the campus of Lower Columbia College home.

History

2010
The Black Bears began play as an expansion team in the West Coast League in 2010. In their inaugural season, they were coached by Bryson LeBlanc and managed a record of 18 wins and 30 losses to finish tied for last in their division. The team finished fifth overall in home attendance by drawing 27,669 fans.

2011
The following season, LeBlanc returned as head coach and their record improved to 28 wins and 26 losses, placing them third in the West division. The team narrowly missed the West Coast League playoffs by losing the final game of the season. The attendance also improved to 30,102.

2012 & First Playoff Appearance
Tim Matz was hired in September 2011 to replace LeBlanc as head coach after the latter left to accept a full-time college assistant coaching position. With a record of 26 wins and 28 losses, the team made their first playoff appearance by coming in second in the West division. They were eliminated in the first two games by the Corvallis Knights.

2013
The next season, Matz returned as Head coach and the Bears repeated their 2011 record with 28 wins and 26 losses, finishing fourth in the South division.

2014
The Black Bears returned with Tim Matz and had a record of 24 wins and 30 losses on the season, finishing third in the South division. The Bears had a season high overall attendance of 31,138.

2015
In September 2014, Grady Tweit was named as the team's new head coach to replace Matz who resigned the previous August. They produced a record of 21 wins and 33 losses, finishing fourth in the West division.

2016
The seventh season of Cowlitz Black Bears baseball brought the return of Grady Tweit and a new split season format in which the WCL season was split equally into two parts, with the winner from each division of each half securing a playoff berth. The 54-game league schedule was divided into a first and second half, each 27 games long. In the first half, the Bears finished third in the South division with a record of 12 wins and 15 losses. In the second half, they finished fourth with a record of 11 wins and 16 losses. They completed the entire season with a record of 23 wins and 31 losses, finishing fourth in the South division. The Cowlitz Black Bears also had the honor of hosting the 2016 West Coast League All-Star Game at David Story Field. The South claimed victory over the North, shutting them out by a score of 4-0.

2017
Cowlitz struggled the first half of their eighth season, finishing in fourth with a record of 11 wins and 16 losses. The Bears turned it around in the second half finishing in second place with a record of 16 wins and 11 losses, coming within a game of a playoff berth. For the whole season, they broke even with a record of 27 wins and 27 losses, finishing third overall.

2018
The Black Bears had a rough ninth season, finishing the first half in third with a record of 10 wins and 17 losses. They saw no improvement in the second half by again finishing third with a record of 10 wins and 17 losses. Overall, Cowlitz finished the season with a record of 20 wins and 34 losses, finishing in third for the second year in a row.

2019 & 10th Anniversary
The 2019 season was the 10th Anniversary of the Cowlitz Black Bears. The Bears repeated their 2018 first half woes by finishing with a record of 10 wins and 17 losses. They kicked it up a notch in the second half, finishing with 14 wins and 13 losses. They ended their anniversary season with an overall record of 24 wins and 30 losses, landing in fifth in the South. The 2019 season would be Coach Grady Tweit's final season with the team.

2020
The 2020 season was canceled due to the coronavirus pandemic. On October 19th, the team announced on their website that they had signed Gary Van Tol to become the new head coach. Soon after, Tol accepted a position in professional baseball, ending a brief tenure as a manager with the organization.

2021
On February 9th, 2021 The Cowlitz Black Bears announced MLB alum, Brian Burres, as their new head coach.

References

External links
 

Amateur baseball teams in Washington (state)
Cowlitz County, Washington
2010 establishments in Washington (state)
Baseball teams established in 2010